Hund Şehzade (1422 – July 1455) was an Ottoman princess, granddaughter of claimant to the throne Süleyman Çelebi, and great granddaughter of Sultan Bayezid I (r.1389 – 1402) of the Ottoman Empire. She was wife of Barsbay, and later of Sayf ad-Din Jaqmaq, Egypt Sultans of the Burji dynasty.

Early life
Born in 1422 as Fatima Şehzade, she was the daughter of Orhan Çelebi, son of Süleyman Çelebi, who was himself the son of Sultan Bayezid I. She had a younger brother named Süleyman Çelebi (1423 – 1437).

In 1433, Şehzade and her brother Süleyman took refuge in Cairo. The Mamluk Sultan Barsbay treated them generously, and rejected her cousin Murad II's requests to surrender them.

First marriage
In 1436, Ibrahim II of Karaman, attacked the Dulkadirids, and captured the disputable town of Kayseri and other fortresses in its vicinity. However, the Dulkadirids retook Kayseri and the surrounding countryside from the Karamanids in December 1436 with Ottoman help. Upon receiving this news Barsbay in March 1437, assembled his advisory council, and decided to send the governors of Syria to help Ibrahim Bey. However, before the crisis escalated, and turned into a military clash, both Ottoman and Mamluk Sultans settled their differences two months later in May. A peace agreement was settled, with Barsbay's marriage to Şehzade.

Second marriage
After Barbay's death in 1438, his successor Sultan Sayf-al-Din Jaqmaq married Şehzade, in order to consolidate good relations with the Ottomans. On 5 January 1447, she made a pilgrimage with the dowry she received at the time of her marriage to Jaqmaq.

The two together had four sons. All of them died of plague at Cairo on 26 March 1449. The eldest one named Ahmed being seven years old. Jaqmaq divorced her on 25 December 1450.

Third marriage
After Jaqmaq divorced Şehzade, she settled in a house in al-Jawdariyya, and married Sahib-al-Hujjab Barsbay Bujashi.

Death
Şehzade died in July 1455 in Cairo.

References

Sources

1422 births
1455 deaths
15th-century Ottoman princesses